The Civic Opera House, also called Lyric Opera House is an opera house located at 20 North Wacker Drive in Chicago. The Civic's main performance space, named for Ardis Krainik, seats 3,563, making it the second-largest opera auditorium in North America, after the Metropolitan Opera House. Built for the Chicago Civic Opera, today it is the permanent home of the Lyric Opera of Chicago. It is part of a complex with a 45-story office tower and two 22-story wings, known as the Civic Opera Building that opened November 4, 1929 and features Art Deco details.

History
Samuel Insull envisioned and hired the design team for building a new opera house to serve as the home for the Chicago Civic Opera. The building has been seen as being shaped like a huge chair and is sometimes referred to as "Insull's Throne" or "Insull's Folly."

Insull selected the architecture firm Graham, Anderson, Probst & White who were responsible for numerous buildings in the downtown Chicago Loop (including the art deco Merchandise Mart and the former Morton Salt headquarters building next door to the Civic Opera House at 110 N Wacker, constructed in the 1950s).  As they did on other occasions, the architects commissioned Henry Hering to produce architectural sculpture for the building. The limestone used on the exterior was brought from Bedford, Indiana and carved by a team of stone carvers at Ingalls Stone Company under the direction of Harry Liva. 

The inaugural season was marked by the première of Camille, a modern opera by 28-year-old Chicago-composer Hamilton Forrest July 15, 1929. It was commissioned by the Civic Opera's prime star and manager, Mary Garden. The opera received mixed reviews and parts of it were broadcast in the Boston area. The Civic Opera is the only house in which the work has ever been performed.

The facility underwent a major renovation in 1993 when Lyric Opera of Chicago purchased the space it had previously rented.  The chairs were repainted and reupholstered, the carpeting replaced, and the gilt paint completely re-stenciled.  The massive project was completed in 1996.

This opera house was the inspiration for the one featured in Orson Welles's film, Citizen Kane. In order for his aspiring opera singer wife to perform, Charles Foster Kane builds an opera house for her, but the quality of her singing reveals her ineptitude. The urban legend is that Samuel Insull built this opera house for his wife, who was not hired by New York's Metropolitan Opera.  Variations of this urban legend also often cite that the "chair" represented by the building's architecture faces West, which was intended to be symbolic of Insull turning his back to New York City's Metropolitan Opera from the geographic standpoint of Chicago.  The fact, however, is that Samuel Insull's wife was not an opera singer.  A variation on this theme is that it was Insull's daughter who wasn't hired—the problem with this variation is that Insull had no daughters.

See also
Civic Opera Building
List of tallest buildings in Chicago

References
Notes

Sources
Chappell, Sally Kitt, Transforming Tradition: Architecture and Planning of Graham, Anderson, Probst and White, 1912–1936, Chicago, Il: University of Chicago Press, 1992
Kvaran, Einar Einarsson, Architectural Sculpture in America, unpublished manuscript
Pearson, Edward Hagelin, "The Other Traviata: Hamilton Forrest's Camille" in The Opera Quarterly, 1995 on oxfordjournals.org

External links
Civic Opera House website
Lyric Opera website
"The Magic Wand of the Opera" Popular Mechanics, February 1930, pp 202-205 technical details of the 1929 advances Civic Opera House over other opera houses of that era - i.e. curtains, back-drops, movable stages, lighting, etc
Chicago landmarks web site with photos of the building

Opera houses in Illinois
Music venues in Chicago
Theatres in Chicago
Central Chicago
1929 establishments in Illinois
Theatres completed in 1929
Music venues completed in 1929
Art Deco architecture in Illinois
Chicago Landmarks